Ljepunice is a village in the municipality of Tuzla, Tuzla Canton, Bosnia and Herzegovina.

Demographics 
According to the 2013 census, its population was 363.

References

Populated places in Tuzla